Parliamentary elections were held in Upper Volta on 30 April 1978. They followed a constitutional referendum the previous year, which came about as a result of the 1974 military coup. A total of 367 candidates contested the elections.

The result was a victory for the Voltaic Democratic Union–African Democratic Rally, which won 28 of the 57 seats in the National Assembly. Voter turnout was just 38.3%.

The new constitution also limited the number of political parties to three, meaning that only the three largest parties in the Assembly were allowed to continue existing, resulting in the African Regroupment Party, the country's oldest party, virtually disappearing.

Results

References

Elections in Burkina Faso
Upper Volta
1978 in Upper Volta